Miss International 2017, the 57th Miss International pageant, was held on November 14, 2017 at Tokyo Dome City Hall in Tokyo, Japan. Kylie Verzosa of the Philippines crowned her successor Kevin Lilliana of Indonesia at the end of the event. This edition also saw the crowning of the first ever moslem women to win Miss International, and was the first to win one of the four major international pageants for Indonesia.

The show was hosted by Tetsuya Bessho on his fourth consecutive year. Amy Ota co-hosted the event, with a performance by Chemistry. This is the second time in Miss International history that the finals night saw the return of the previous year's runners-up to crown their respective successors.

Background
 

On April 4, 2017, it was announced during a broadcast conference by Akemi Shimomura, president of the International Cultural Association, that the 2017 pageant would be held in Tokyo Dome City Hall, Tokyo, Japan for the second consecutive year on Tuesday, November 14, 2017.

The 2017 edition saw the debuts of Cambodia, Cook Islands and Laos; and the returns of Ethiopia has not competed since 2009, Czech Republic since 2010, Lithuania since 2013, Chile and Curacao since 2014, Mongolia and Paraguay since 2015. Argentina, Aruba, Cuba, Denmark, Guam, Ireland, Nigeria, Northern Marianas, Puerto Rico and Sri Lanka have withdrawn from the competition.

Results

Placements

Order of announcements
(Vote?

Top 15

Top 8

Continental queens

Contestants
Sixty-nine contestants competed for the title of Miss International 2017:

Notes

Debuts

Returns
Last competed in 2009:
 

Last competed in 2010:
 

Last competed in 2013:
 

Last competed in 2014:
 
 

Last competed in 2015:

Designations

Designations
  - Miss International Cambodia 2017, Nheat Sophea was appointed by BK'A Entertainment .Co., Ltd. Nheat Sophea was 1st Runner-up of Miss Grand Cambodia 2017.
 - Miss International Canada 2017, Marta Magdalena Stepien was appointed by Dennis Davila, president of Miss Universe Canada organization (Beauties of Canada). Marta was the 1st runner up at Miss Universe Canada 2017.
  - Miss International Ethiopia 2017, Bamlak Dereje was appointed by Henock Leuleseged, National Director of Miss International Ethiopia. Bamlak is Ethiopian Model in Addis Ababa.
  - Miss International Haiti 2017, Caroline Minerve was appointed by Chris Puesan, the CEO of Miss Haiti. Caroline was the 1st Runner-up of Miss Haiti 2017.
  - Miss International Laos 2017, Phounesup Phonnyotha was appointed by Miss Lao Co., Ltd., Phounesup Phonnyotha was 1st Runner-up of Miss Grand Laos 2017.
  - Miss International Lithuania 2017, Patricija Belousova was appointed by Closed election Miss International Lithuania franchise holder in Vilnius. Patricija was Miss Lithuania 2014.
  - Miss International Macau 2017, Sofia Paiva was appointed by Macau Pageant Alliance, which is an organisation has been sending Macau's delegates to various international beauty contests after Miss Macau beauty pageant was last held in 2009.
  - Miss Mexico International 2017, Citlali Higuera was appointed by Lupita Jones, the national director of Miss Mexico. Citlali was the 1st Runner-up of Miss Mexico 2017.
  - Miss International Moldova 2017, Daniela Bejan was appointed by Miss Bikini Moldova Organizer. Daniela is a model.
  - Miss International Norway 2017, Vilde Andresen Bø was appointed by the Miss Norway beauty pageant, after an announcement made by the same in its official web page. Andresen Bø was the 2nd Runner-up of Miss Norway 2017.
  - Miss International Tunisia 2017, Khaoula Gueye was appointed by Aida Antar. Khaoula was the 2nd Runner-up of Miss Tunisia 2016.
  - Miss Venezuela Internacional 2017, Diana Croce was appointed by Osmel Sousa, the national director of Miss Venezuela pageant. Croce was the 1st Runner-up of Miss Venezuela 2016.

Withdraws
  - Agustina Belén Garro
  - No Contest.
  – Claudia Moras Báez
  – Natasja Voldstedlund, withdrew due to illness.
  – The directors of Miss Universe Guam are still in the process of recruiting eligible competitors. Miss Guam pageant rescheduled to January 2018.
  - No Contest.
  - No Contest.
  - Contest Postponed. The upcoming Miss Marianas will hold after Miss International 2017.
  – Beverly Rodriguez did not participate. No delegate is going to be sent this year because of the hurricanes that affected the island.
  - The Miss Sri Lanka 2017 held in special award ceremony. The organizer has only crowned one winner to Miss Universe.

General references

References

External links
 Official website

2017 beauty pageants
2017 in Tokyo
Beauty pageants in Japan
2017
November 2017 events in Japan